The San Marino Athletics Federation (Italian Federazione Sammarinese di Atletica Leggera ) is the governing body for the sport of athletics in San Marino.

Affiliations 
International Association of Athletics Federations (IAAF)
European Athletic Association (EAA)
San Marino Olympic Committee

National records 
FSAL maintains the Sammarinese records in athletics.

External links 
Official webpage 

San Marino
Sports governing bodies in San Marino
National governing bodies for athletics